The Happiest Day in the Life of Olli Mäki is a 2016 Finnish biographical drama film co-written and directed by Juho Kuosmanen. It won the Un Certain Regard prize at the 2016 Cannes Film Festival. It was selected as the Finnish entry for the Best Foreign Language Film at the 89th Academy Awards but was not nominated.

Plot
It's the year 1962: Olli Mäki (Jarkko Lahti) is a Finnish amateur-turned-professional boxer from the town of Kokkola who, while attending a wedding, becomes smitten with his friend Raija (Oona Airola). They travel to Helsinki where his manager Elis Ask (Eero Milonoff) is preparing Olli's big break: a World Boxing Association featherweight championship title fight against renowned American boxer Davey Moore (John Bosco Jr.) in the Helsinki Olympic Stadium. The match would be one of the biggest events in Finnish sporting history, even though most people – including Olli – are skeptical: Moore's record vastly outclasses Olli's.

The preparations are not without problems: Olli is lightweight and has to lose enough weight within two weeks to reach featherweight, Elis' enthusiasm about the match includes hiring a documentary film crew who become increasingly disruptive as the preparations go on, and staging various dinner parties with the sponsors of the match which require the uncomfortable Olli to adhere to protocol. The circus around the match disheartens Olli, who falls more and more in love with Raija – Raija, however, feels she's a burden on Olli's preparation, and goes back to Kokkola. Olli has a hard time concentrating, and eventually follows Raija, much to the dismay of Elis, who is concerned that Olli won't make weight by the time the weigh-in comes, let alone be prepared for the match itself.

Olli eventually persuades Elis to leave him to prepare on his own, and puts himself through a drastic process of losing weight: during the weigh-in, he barely makes weight, and on the same day, he proposes to Raija. As the match begins, Olli has a good start in the first round, but gets knocked down several times in the second and the referee calls for a technical knockout. While Elis is disappointed, Olli seems to be at peace with the loss, and quietly walks away from the post-match dinner with Raija.

Cast
 Jarkko Lahti as Olli Mäki
 Oona Airola as Raija Jänkä
 Eero Milonoff as Elis Ask
 John Bosco Jr. as Davey Moore

The real Olli and Raija Mäki appear briefly at the very end of the film, as Raija looks at them and asks Olli "Do you think we'll be like them when we're old?"

Production
The Happiest Day in the Life of Olli Mäki was the feature-length debut of director Juho Kuosmanen, who had previously directed short films as well as theatre and opera productions.

The film was shot on location, mostly in Helsinki. To achieve the 1960s look, Kuosmanen and cinematographer Jani-Petteri Passi decided to film on 16mm Kodak Tri-X black and white film stock. They felt this gave the film a vintage look even though the film stock was not meant for feature films. The production team ended up ordering all the stock available in Europe and the United States after which Kodak had to produce more.

Critical reception
The Happiest Day in the Life of Olli Mäki has received overwhelmingly positive reviews from critics. It currently rates a full 100% at Rotten Tomatoes and 83 at Metacritic which classifies the film's reception as "universal acclaim" according to the website's criteria. David Rooney of The Hollywood Reporter called the film "a small marvel of impeccable craftsmanship", lauding its black and white cinematography and "faultless and unshowy" performances. Geoffrey Macnab of The Independent said Olli Mäki "rethinks and revitalises" the genre of boxing movies and also found it one of the year's most likeable films. Both Macnab and Kristopher Tapley of Variety called the film a leading contender for the foreign language Oscar.

Awards
The film has won several awards at film festivals:
 Un Certain Regard, Cannes Film Festival
 Golden Eye, Zurich Film Festival
 Gold Hugo, New Directors Competition, Chicago International Film Festival

The film also won eight Jussi Awards at the 71st Jussi Awards in 2017.
 Best Film (Jussi Rantamäki, producer)
 Best Director (Juho Kuosmanen)
 Best Actor (Jarkko Lahti)
 Best Supporting Actress (Oona Airola)
 Best Cinematography (J-P Passi)
 Best Editing (Jussi Rautaniemi)
 Best Costume Design (Sari Suominen)
 Best Makeup (Salla Yli-Luopa)

See also
 List of submissions to the 89th Academy Awards for Best Foreign Language Film
 List of Finnish submissions for the Academy Award for Best Foreign Language Film

References

External links
 

2016 films
2016 drama films
2016 biographical drama films
2016 directorial debut films
2010s sports drama films
Finnish biographical drama films
Finnish black-and-white films
2010s Finnish-language films
Boxing films
Biographical films about sportspeople
Cultural depictions of boxers
Cultural depictions of Finnish men
Films directed by Juho Kuosmanen